A Tomb for Boris Davidovich (Serbo-Croatian: Grobnica za Borisa Davidoviča / Гробница за Бориса Давидовича) is a collection of seven short stories by Danilo Kiš written in 1976 (translated into English by Duska Mikic-Mitchell in 1978). The stories are based on historical events and deal with themes of political deception, betrayal, and murder in Eastern Europe during the first half of the 20th century (except for "Dogs and Books" which takes place in 14th century France). Several of the stories are written as fictional biographies wherein the main characters interact with historical figures. The Dalkey Archive Press edition includes an introduction by Joseph Brodsky and an afterword by William T. Vollmann. Harold Bloom includes A Tomb for Boris Davidovich in his list of canonical works of the period he names the Chaotic Age (1900–present) in The Western Canon.
The book was featured in Penguin's series "Writers from the Other Europe" from the 1970s, edited by Philip Roth.

Contents
 "The Knife with the Rosewood Handle"
Miksha is a Jewish tailor's apprentice turned revolutionary whose commitment and cruelty lead him to commit a sordid murder and die in prison.

 "The Sow that Eats her Farrow"
Verschoyle, a Republican volunteer in the Spanish Civil War, is punished for criticizing the Soviet takeover.

 "The Mechanical Lions"
Chelyustnikov organises a fake religious service for a Western dignitary visiting Kyiv.

 "The Magic Card Dealing"
The seemingly unmotivated murder of Dr. Kaul Taube is revealed to have been decided by a card game between two criminals.

 "A Tomb for Boris Davidovich"
Boris Davidovich Novsky, a noted revolutionary, is arrested with the intent to extract a confession from him in a show-trial. During his interrogation Novsky duels with his interrogator Fedukin over how he will be remembered in the future, fighting over the conclusion to his biography.

 "Dogs and Books"
Set up as a parallel to "Boris Davidovich", the story deals with Baruch David Neumann, a Jew forced to convert to Christianity during the Shepherds' Crusade (1320).

 "The Short Biography of A. A. Darmolatov"
Darmolatov, a minor revolutionary poet, is ruined by disease rather than terror.

Plagiarism controversy
The book was the subject of a long and tedious plagiarism controversy, one of the most famous literary scandals in Tito's Yugoslavia. The controversy about the nature of the "borrowing" continues to this day. In particular, Kiš was accused of plagiarising 7000 days in Siberia by Karlo Štajner. Kiš wrote a book titled The Anatomy Lesson, written in 1978, in which he defended his methods (which included verbatim quotations of full passages with no attribution) as legitimate, and launched harsh personal and professional attacks on his critics. In 1981 a book Narcis bez lica by eminent Yugoslav critic Dragan M. Jeremic, was again devoted to in-depth analysis and literary criticism of A Tomb for Boris Davidovich, in which the case for plagiarism has been made again by comparing originals and Kiš' prose in detail. Numerous papers have been published on this topic since; in 2005, a book Lazni car Scepan Kis by Nebojsa Vasovic again takes a fresh new look on the controversy.

References

External links
 A Tomb for Boris Davidovich – Dalkey Archive Press information page and excerpt.

1976 short story collections
Serbian books
Books involved in plagiarism controversies
Harcourt (publisher) books